Acronicta hamamelis, the witch hazel dagger moth or puzzling dagger moth, is a moth of the family Noctuidae. The species was first described by Achille Guenée in 1852. It is found in Canada (Nova Scotia, Quebec and Ontario) and parts of the United States, including Maryland.

The larvae feed on witch-hazel.

References

External links
Moths of Maryland

Acronicta
Moths of North America
Moths described in 1852